Theophilus Blakely  was an Irish Anglican priest.

Blakely was educated at Trinity College, Dublin. he was Dean of Connor  from 1811 to 1824; Dean of Achonry from 1824 to 1839;  and Dean of Down  from then until his death on 1 December 1855.

References

Alumni of Trinity College Dublin
Irish Anglicans
Deans of Connor
Deans of Achonry
Deans of Down
1855 deaths
Year of birth missing